Glooscap First Nation is a Canadian Mi'kmaq aboriginal community located in both Kings County and Hants County, Nova Scotia. Forest management is practiced by the band. There is a variety store, gas bar, Greco Pizza, and gaming centre. There is also a health centre, youth centre and chapel. The Glooscap Landing Business Park is also owned by Glooscap First Nation which houses a second gas bar and Tim Hortons. The 2022 population was 415 people of whom approximately 100 lived on the reserve, making Glooscap the third-smallest First Nation community in Nova Scotia after Bear River First Nation and Annapolis Valley First Nation.
	
Reserves
 Glooscap 35
 Glooscap Landing Reserve

History

Glooscap was created in 1907 from land owned by Silas Tertius Rand, a missionary of the Micmac Missionary Society. Rand purchased 450 acres close to the town of Hantsport so they could make a living selling artwork in the marketplace. The reserve was called Horton but administered by Annapolis Valley First Nation 30 km away in Cambridge.

In 1984, only one home and family were living in Horton, and they were not receiving adequate service delivery from Annapolis Valley First Nation. The Chief of Annapolis Valley First Nation, Chief Rita Smith lead the government advocacy for independence of Horton from Annapolis Valley. In 1984 Horton separated from Annapolis Valley First Nation and became its own independent First Nation reservation. Rita Smith became Horton's first Chief. The community was co-founded by five families: Smith, Peters, Francis, Labrador, and Pictou.

 Rita Smith was elected Chief from 1984 to 1989
 Joseph Peters was elected Chief from 1989 to 1995
 Shirley Clarke was elected Chief from 1995 to 2012
 Sidney Peters was elected Chief from 2012 to present

In 2001, Horton changed its name to Glooscap First Nation in honour of the legendary hero of the Mi'kmaq. Glooscap's home was located nearby at Blomidon Provincial Park, Nova Scotia.

Financial controversies
In 2010, controversy erupted in the news media and on the reserve when it was revealed that band councillors of the tiny community each earn between $210,000 and $260,000 a year and one councillor earned almost a million dollars one fiscal year, after selling a lucrative business on the reserve. Shirley Clarke, Chief of the reserve, defended the council's high salaries saying they work hard and their responsibilities are vast. Some native organizations have defended the salaries saying they include legitimate expenses.

In 2015, a staff member was charged with theft of more than $160,000 from a community-owned business. The staff member was the manager of the gas station and gaming centre and was taking funds from the business's safe and depositing the funds into her personal account. The ex-manager was sentenced to two years in prison and to pay back $120,000.

Governance
The community is represented by a chief and a three-person council. The community is managed by the director of administration.
Since 2004, the band and the Town of Hantsport have had a shared water supply.

Glooscap has a custom election code which allows the elected chief and councillors to serve five-year terms.

In 2012, the Glooscap First Nation held an election. A new Chief and Council was elected. Sidney Peters, the brother of former Glooscap First Nation Chief Shirley Clarke, was elected Chief with 55% of the vote in an election that nearly 80% of the membership voted. He is a fifth-generation Chief within the Peters family.

The new council implemented some new policies and removed some corrupt officials from their offices. They also created a new economic development corporation to provide more transparency and improve the sustainability of the community.

In 2017, Sidney Peters was re-elected with 95% of the votes (174 to 12 votes). Two other brothers were elected to council.

In 2022, Sidney Peters was acclaimed but a new council was elected.

Economic development

In 2011, the band formed a new, independently run corporation that has the responsibility of improving the economy and sustainability of Glooscap First Nation. The focus will on building partnerships with neighboring municipalities, businesses and organizations in order to benefit the entire region.

The corporation rebranded to become Glooscap Ventures in 2015 and are currently overseeing the $20 million Glooscap Landing Project as well as renewable energies projects and a seafood company.

In 2017, Glooscap was recognized for its economic development on a national scale. They were awarded the 2017 CANDO Indigenous Community Economic Developer of the Year. This award is presented to Canada's top economic development indigenous community on an annual basis.

References

External links

First Nations governments in Atlantic Canada
First Nations in Nova Scotia
Communities in Kings County, Nova Scotia
Mi'kmaq governments